Wayne Meyer may refer to:
Wayne R. Meyer (1949–2009), American politician and farmer from Idaho
 Wayne E. Meyer (1926–2009), American rear admiral
 USS Wayne E. Meyer, an American US Navy destroyer